Stadtklinik is a German television series.

Plot
In a Cologne hospital, which is also called Stadtklinik, doctors and nurses face daily medical and human problems. In addition, there are competitions, love affairs and intrigues among colleagues. Medical controversy is the order of the day for the city's clinic, as are social controversies here, for example in questions of euthanasia.

Firstly, Professor Dr. Wilhelm Himmel the head of the hospital, later he is replaced by Professor Baaden.

See also
List of German television series

External links
 

1993 German television series debuts
2000 German television series endings
German medical television series
Television shows set in Cologne
German-language television shows
RTL (German TV channel) original programming